Since the foundation of the Republic of Türkiye in 1923, the country held seven referendums on national level. In the first two referendums (1961 and 1982), new Constitutions were submitted to public approval by military regimes. The remaining five referendums concerned Constitutional reforms and legislative changes proposed by civilian governments in 1987, 1988, 2007, 2010 and 2017.

The processes of submission to the public vote are carried out by the election boards under the management and supervision of the Supreme Election Council.

Constitutional referendums
Amendments to the constitution can be put to referendum by both the legislative branch (parliament) and the executive branch (president).

A referendum on the constitutional amendment is held on the first Sunday after the sixtieth day following the publication of the relevant amendment in the Official Gazette.

In conformity with the conditions set forth in the law, all Turkish citizens over eighteen years of age have the right to vote in elections and to take part in referendums. In accordance with the Law No. 298 on Basic Provisions of Elections and Electoral Registers, citizens in foreign countries can cast their votes starting twenty days before the referendum.

Presidential election referendums 
According to article 101 of the Constitution, presidential elections can be turned into a referendum under certain conditions. Turkey elects its presidents with a two-round system. If one of the presidential candidates who gains the right to run for the second round is unable to participate in the election for any reason, the second round shall be conducted by substituting the vacant candidacy in conformity with the ranking in the first round. If only one candidate remains for the second round, this ballot shall be then conducted as a referendum. If the presidential candidate receives the majority of the valid votes, he or she shall be elected as president. If that candidate fails to receive the majority of the valid votes in the election, the presidential election are scheduled be renewed.

Referendum results
Voters tended to vote "yes" in the referendums. However, excluding the 1961 and 1982 referendums, which took place under the conditions of a military regime, two of the remaining five referendums did not result in the way the ruling political parties desired. The average rate of acceptance by the public of the proposals brought by the governments in those referendums was 52.6%.

Turkish governments have not achieved easy victories in the referendums. The ANAP governments faced undesirable results in both referendums in 1987 and 1988. The constitutional amendment, which was put to a referendum by the government in 2017, received the approval of the voters by a small margin. It is noteworthy that the differences between "yes" and "no" votes were small, especially in the 1987 and 2017 referendums. Below is the overview of all the referendums.

See also
Elections in Turkey
Constitution of Turkey

Bibliography

References